Zakharkovo is a rural locality and the administrative center of Zakharkovsky Selsoviet Rural Settlement, Konyshyovsky District, Kursk Oblast, Russia. Population:

Geography 
The village is located on the Kotlevka River (a tributary of the Vablya in the basin of the Seym), 64 km from the Russia–Ukraine border, 58 km north-west of Kursk, 6 km south-east of the district center – the urban-type settlement Konyshyovka.

 Climate
Zakharkovo has a warm-summer humid continental climate (Dfb in the Köppen climate classification).

Transport 
Zakharkovo is located 61 km from the federal route  Ukraine Highway, 44 km from the route  Crimea Highway, 45.5 km from the route  (Trosna – M3 highway), 30 km from the road of regional importance  (Fatezh – Dmitriyev), 5 km from the road  (Konyshyovka – Zhigayevo – 38K-038), 6.5 km from the road  (Lgov – Konyshyovka), on the road of intermunicipal significance  (38K-005 – Zakharkovo), 4 km from the nearest railway halt 565 km (railway line Navlya – Lgov-Kiyevsky).

The rural locality is situated 64 km from Kursk Vostochny Airport, 154 km from Belgorod International Airport and 267 km from Voronezh Peter the Great Airport.

References

Notes

Sources

Rural localities in Konyshyovsky District